Caroline Lambert (born 1 April 1995) is a French ice hockey player and member of the French national team, currently playing with HT Thurgau in the Women's League (SWHL A) and with EC Wil in the Swiss Women's Hockey League B (SWHL B).

She represented France at the 2019 IIHF Women's World Championship.

References

External links

1995 births
Living people
French expatriate ice hockey people
French expatriate sportspeople in Slovakia
French expatriate sportspeople in Sweden
French expatriate sportspeople in Switzerland
French women's ice hockey goaltenders